Esteban Mullins (born 2 February 1967) is a Costa Rican fencer. He competed in the individual sabre event at the 1992 Summer Olympics.

References

External links
 

1967 births
Living people
Costa Rican male sabre fencers
Olympic fencers of Costa Rica
Fencers at the 1992 Summer Olympics